Capital do Café Airport  is the airport serving Cacoal, Brazil.

History
The airport was commissioned on June 2, 2009. It was built as a replacement to an older facility located closer to downtown which was then closed.

Airlines and destinations

Access

See also

List of airports in Brazil

References

External links

Airports in Rondônia
Airports established in 2009